Art of Persia is a three-part 2020 BBC documentary series about the history and culture of Iran. The series is presented by Samira Ahmed.

References

2020 British television series debuts
2020 British television series endings
2020s British documentary television series
BBC television documentaries
English-language television shows